Seo Woo (born Kim Moon-joo; July 7, 1985) is a South Korean actress. She made her breakthrough with the film Crush and Blush (2008). She is best known for her roles in the films Paju and The Housemaid, as well as her roles in the TV dramas Tamra, the Island, Cinderella's Sister and Flames of Desire.

Career
Seo first became known to the public as the "4D Girl" (wacky girl) in the popular "Ok me wa ka" commercial promoting the Lotte ice cream brand. After her debut as a supporting actress in the 2007 film My Son, she successfully auditioned and landed the part in the sitcom Kimchi Cheese Smile.

The following year, Seo received her breakout role in the black comedy Crush and Blush. She received considerable attention and the "Best New Actress" title in numerous awards for her success in the part—she was nominated for the same title in film at the 45th Baeksang Arts Awards. In 2009, Seo took on the lead role in the cult favorite Tamra, the Island, a period drama set on Jeju Island. She then contributed her vocals to "My Fair Lady," one of the tracks in Lee Seung-hwan's 20th anniversary album Hwantastic Friends.

Seo continued to challenge herself, delivering a much-praised turn in arthouse film Paju, and landing a role opposite celebrated actress Jeon Do-yeon in The Housemaid, which screened in competition at the 2010 Cannes Film Festival.

She and Moon Geun-young played siblings in the popular modern fairytale retelling Cinderella's Stepsister, but Seo later said she considers it her worst performance, despite being the character she worked hardest on. Afterwards she played a complex character in the melodrama Flames of Desire.

In the family drama If Tomorrow Comes, she played a cheerful daughter to veteran actress Go Doo-shim. She next portrayed a calm yet brave art major in the fantasy-horror TV movie Knock, about a magical mask passed down in a shaman family.

From 2013 to 2014, she played a Baekje-era femme fatale in the daily period drama The King's Daughter, Soo Baek-hyang.

In June 2016, Seo signed with Cube Entertainment. She left in 2017.

In December 2018, Seo signed with The CNT.

On December 12, 2019, Seo was featured in a horror film titled The House and took on the role of a pregnant woman named Eun Bi-roo.

In December 2020, Seo was featured in The Allies - A Time for a Green Hero as a supporting character.

Filmography

Film

Television series

Music video

Awards and nominations

References

External links

Living people
1985 births
People from Seoul
South Korean television actresses
South Korean film actresses
South Korean female models
Cube Entertainment artists
Konkuk University alumni